Trans National Place, also known as 115 Winthrop Square, was a proposed supertall skyscraper in Boston, Massachusetts, US. Original designs were completed by architect Renzo Piano (with Boston firm Childs Bertman Tseckares Inc.) who later left the project in March 2007. Trans National Place was intended to stand as the tallest building in Boston, Massachusetts, and New England, surpassing the 60-story John Hancock Tower by 15 stories and at least  to become the tallest building in the city. The developer was local businessman Steve Belkin, who also owns an adjoining mid-rise building, which would have been torn down as part of the project.

The tower was cancelled in 2008 amid a declining commercial real estate market and after the Federal Aviation Administration objected to the building's proposed height, deeming the structure a possible flight obstruction to the air traffic of nearby Logan International Airport. The project was superseded by the Winthrop Center, a proposed skyscraper for which a design was selected in 2016.

See also 
 List of tallest buildings in Boston

References

External links 
 Entry on Skyscraperpage.com
 Emporis.com

Unbuilt buildings and structures in the United States
Federal Aviation Administration
Proposed skyscrapers in the United States